Shithi Saha is a Bangladeshi singer. She has done playback in Projapoti (2011) film with veteran Ferdous Wahid. She sings Tagore songs, folk and also film songs. She has made four studio albums.

Early life
Shithi learned music from her mother. Shithi's mentors were Ashok Saha and Late Ohaidul Huq. She learnt classical, folk and modern styles of music from Chhayanaut and Shommelon Parishad. She has won more than 100 Awards in that years, including four National Awards given for Rabindra Sangeet.

Career
In 2005, Shithi debuted with the album Kichu Bolbo Bole, a compilation of Tagore songs. It gained popularity. In 2009, she published her second album Kolpona, containing 12 songs. She received national recognition with her first solo and third overall album Golpo Patay. In 2015, she published her fourth album Mon Balika. On 13 March 2016, she was given a special honour at Indo-Bangladesh cultural festival, held in Auckland, New Zealand for her contribution in Bengali music. A musical programme, Shithir Otithi, is premiered on Maasranga Television.

Discography
Kichu Bolbo Bole (2005)
Kolpona (2009)
Golpo Patay (2011)
Mon Balika (2015) 
"Raat Jaga Pakhi"
"Unkey Khayalon Mein"

Filmography
Projapoti ('Taka' song with Ferdous Wahid)
Pushpa ('Saami Saami' song in Bengali)

Awards
Bangladesh National Awards - Best Tagore Singer (4 times)
Special honour at Indo-Bangladesh Cultural Festival, 2016 
Winner: Bachsas Award for Best Female Playback Singer - 2016 for Bhola To Jayna Tare

References

21st-century Bangladeshi women singers
21st-century Bangladeshi singers
Bangladeshi folk singers
Year of birth missing (living people)
Living people
Bangladeshi Hindus